Ocotea aciphylla is a species of Ocotea in the plant family Lauraceae. It forms a tree 12–18 m tall. It has small hermaphrodite flowers of 3–4 mm long. It is found in the Amazon river basin mostly to 1200 m.

References

aciphylla
Trees of South America
Trees of the Caribbean
Flora of the Amazon
Flora of Bolivia
Flora of Brazil
Flora of Colombia
Flora of French Guiana
Flora of Guadeloupe
Flora of Martinique
Flora of Peru
Flora of Suriname
Flora of Venezuela
Least concern plants
Least concern biota of South America
Taxonomy articles created by Polbot